Chitra Pournami may refer to:

 Chitra Pournami (film)
 Chitra Pournami (festival)